SHGA may stand for:

 Self Help Graphics & Art –  a community arts center in East Los Angeles, California
 Short-handed goals allowed – a statistic in ice hockey